Cassard was an improved  74-gun ship of the line of the French Navy. Along with her sister-ship , she carried 24-pounder long guns on her upper deck, a featured normally reserved for the larger, three-deckers capital ships or for 80-gun ships.

Completed as Lion, she took part in the Expédition d'Irlande in December 1796. On 24 February 1798, she was renamed to Glorieux, and eventually to Cassard the next month.

Under Commodore Gilbert-Amable Faure, she took part in the Atlantic campaign of 1806 in Willaumez' squadron, taking two prizes on the way. In August, the 1806 Great Coastal hurricane caused her to separate from the rest of the fleet; she returned to Brest on 13 October.

She took part in Willaumez' attempt to rescue blockaded ships from Lorient and anchored in Rochefort, where she took part in the Battle of the Basque Roads in April 1809. During the battle, she attempted to escape into Rochefort harbour, ran aground, and was refloated by throwing part of her guns overboard. She remained deactivated in Rochefort.

She was eventually condemned in May 1818, and used as a coal hulk in Rochefort, before being broken up in 1832.

See also
 List of ships of the line of France

References

Ships of the line of the French Navy
Téméraire-class ships of the line
Coal hulks
1803 ships
Ships built in France